Grove House may refer to:

in the United Kingdom
Grove House, Dunstable
Grove House, Hampton
Grove House, Hampstead, formerly part of Admiral's House, Hampstead
Grove House, Harrogate
Grove House, Manchester
Grove House, Roehampton
Arnos Grove house, Cannon Hill, London
The Grove House, a house of Harrow School, Harrow, London
Nuffield Lodge, Regent's Park, London, also known as Grove House

in the United States
John A. Grove House, Bluffton, Indiana
Dr. John Grove House and Office, Liberty, Indiana
Benjamin Grove House, Louisville, Kentucky, listed on the National Register of Historic Places
Claud D. Grove and Berenice Sinclair Grove House, Jefferson City, Missouri